Castle Knowe, also known as Clinch Castle, is the site of an Iron Age hillfort in Northumberland, England, about 1 mile south-east of the village of Ingram. It is a scheduled monument.

Description
The fort is in the Cheviot Hills, where there are other Iron Age sites including those at Old Fawden Hill and Chubden Hill, visible from Castle Knowe to the south-west.

The hill has steep slopes to the west and north, less steep to the east and south. The fort's outer rampart is the most substantial. There is an original entrance on the east side, where the rampart's ends are slightly inturned.

There are remains of seven or more roundhouses within the fort, of diameter ; there is some overlapping, indicating that there was more than one phase of occupation.

References

Scheduled monuments in Northumberland
Archaeological sites in Northumberland
Hill forts in Northumberland
Ingram, Northumberland